The State Anthem of the Republic of Khakassia is the regional anthem of Khakassia, a federal subject of Russia. The Russian lyrics were written by Vladislav Torosov, and the Khakass lyrics were written by V. Shulbayeva and G. Kazachinova in 2014. Music was composed by German Tanbayev. The anthem was officially adopted on 11 February 2015.

Lyrics

See also 
 Music in Khakassia

Notes

References 

Khakass
Regional songs
Asian anthems